Me Before You (Original Motion Picture Soundtrack) is the soundtrack album to the 2016 film Me Before You, based on the 2012 novel of the same name. The album, released on June 1, 2016, by Interscope Records, featured a compilation of songs from various artists including Ed Sheeran, Imagine Dragons, Holychild, Max Jury, Jack Garratt, The 1975, X Ambassadors among others. Me Before You (Original Motion Picture Score), another album featuring instrumentals from the film's original score composed by Craig Armstrong was released on June 3, 2016, by WaterTower Music, accompanying with the film's theatrical release.

Release 
Interscope Records officially announced the soundtrack in April 2016, featuring various incorporated songs and the track list was released on the same date. Erich Lee's remix of X Ambassadors' track "Unsteady" was released the following day, on April 23, followed by Imagine Dragons' "Not Today" also being released on April 29. The original song for the film, "Till The End" performed by Jessie Ware was released as a promotional single on May 26, 2016, also being accompanied with a music video featuring Ware performing the track, and stills from the film in the background. Ken Hamm of Soulbounce magazine, wrote that the track is an "easy listening ballad about that special someone in her life. The lush sound bed is composed of subdued guitar strings, drums, finger snaps and whispery harmonies that  Jessie’s silken voice. While the lyrics aren’t anything we haven’t heard before, the composition and arrangement of the song, not to mention Ware’s vocals, give the track the necessary oomph for consideration on your baelist." The album was released on June 1, while the score composed by Craig Armstrong was released by WaterTower Music on June 3.

Reception 
Olivia Truffaut-Wong of Bustle called that "the soundtrack may be short, but it is effective in evoking the emotions of the film". Susan Wloszczyna of RogerEbert.com praised director Thea Sharrock for the selection of musical artists, Ed Sheeran and Imagine Dragons in the film's soundtrack. PopSugar wrote "The Me Before You Soundtrack Is Your New Favorite Playlist" In the mixed critical review for The Seattle Times, Kate Clark wrote "the film is sweet but often loses impact in its most serious moments by blasting a happy pop soundtrack". Jonathan Broxton wrote "Me Before You is a very typical romantic drama score, and as such is highly unlikely to set the film music world alight, especially for those film music fans who need a little more orchestral bombast in their scores. However, for fans of Craig Armstrong’s serious, strong, earnestly sincere dramatic and romantic writing, it’s a top notch release."

Track listing

Chart performance

Weekly charts

Year-end charts

References 

Film scores
2010s film soundtrack albums
2016 soundtrack albums
WaterTower Music soundtracks
Interscope Records soundtracks
Craig Armstrong (composer) soundtracks
Albums produced by Alex da Kid
Albums produced by Mike Crossey
Albums produced by Jeff Bhasker